Xu Qiliang (born March 1950) is a former air force general in the People's Liberation Army Air Force (PLAAF) of the People's Republic of China. He served as a Vice Chairman of the Central Military Commission of the People's Republic of China from 2013 to 2023, and served as a Vice Chairman of the Central Military Commission of the Chinese Communist Party from 2012 to 2022. He served as a member of the 18th and the 19th Politburo of the Chinese Communist Party. He was promoted from Commander of the PLAAF from 2007 to 2012.

Biography 
Born in Linqu County, Shandong to a peasant's family, he entered the PLA and its Air Force No. 1 aeronautic preparatory school in 1966, learned piloting, and joined the Chinese Communist Party the following year. Later he transferred to the Air Force No. 8 and No. 5 aeronautic schools. He became a pilot after graduation in August 1969.

Xu was promoted to head of the military division in 1983, and vice army corps commander the next year. In 1985, he became chief of staff at the Air Force Shanghai headquarters, and also entered the PLA National Defense University for training. He was promoted to corps commander of the PLA Air Force in 1991 and was made a major general. In 1993, he became vice chief of staff of the Air Force and studied at the National Defense University again. After graduation, he was promoted to chief of staff of the PLA Air Force. He was made a lieutenant general in 1996.

In 1999, Xu became the vice commander and Air Force commander of the Shenyang Military Region, and studied at the National Defense University for the 3rd time in 2001. He was elevated to vice chief of staff of the PLA General Staff Department. He was made a full general on June 20, 2007, and became the commander of the PLA Air Force in September of that year. In October 2012, he was China's first career air force officer promoted to Vice Chairman of the Central Military Commission and was succeeded as Air Force Commander by General Ma Xiaotian.

He is also a member of the 19th Politburo of the Chinese Communist Party. He has been an alternate member of the 14th and 15th Central Committees of the Chinese Communist Party, and a full member of the 16th, 17th, and 18th Central Committees.

In July 2018, Xu met in Beijing with the US Secretary of Defense, James Mattis, to discuss regional issues and where the two men each laid out his country's military concerns before the other.

Awards and decorations

Military ribbons within the People's Republic of China only reflect the wearer's echelon and time in service. Consequently, Xu's ribbon rack, being seven rows high, indicates he is at the Central Military Commission (CMC) level, the gold ribbon with a single star indicates he is a member of the CMC, and the rest of his ribbons indicate his time in service through a combination of one, two, three, and four-year service ribbons totaling forty-six years.

References 

 China Vitae - Xu Qiliang

Living people
1950 births
Members of the 19th Politburo of the Chinese Communist Party
People's Liberation Army generals from Shandong
Commanders of the People's Liberation Army Air Force
People from Weifang
PLA National Defence University alumni
Members of the 18th Politburo of the Chinese Communist Party